The Southwest Ensemble Theatre was formed in Phoenix, Arizona in 1971 as a non-profit corporation in the State of Arizona.

The founding members were Robert L. Johnson, Producing Director and Keith A. Anderson, Artistic Director.  The first production for what became known as S.E.T., was the world premiere of "The Last Pad" by playwright William Inge in March 1972.  Robert L. Johnson produced the production while Keith A. Anderson (Lionel Keith) directed.  Included in the original cast were Nick Nolte, Jim Matz and Dick Elmer (Richard Elmore).  The play opened at the Kerr Studios in Scottsdale and then moved to the Unitarian Church in Phoenix as the Kerr was not available for an extended run.  "The Last Pad" was awarded the "Best Play" by The Arizona Republic for 1972.  Southwest Ensemble Theatre operated for several years in various locations including The Phoenix Theatre Center, but after moving into the new Scottsdale Center For The Arts, they closed before the end of their first season in the new venue.

S.E.T. made an effort to reorganize and start again, but like many small theatres suffered under increased expenses and dwindling audiences and finally closed permanently by 1980.  Keith Anderson currently directs theatre in San Diego.  Robert L. Johnson went on to act and direct as well as manage convention and performing arts centers in Arizona, Utah and Iowa.  Johnson presently directs and produce in Phoenix, while preparing a Broadway revival of a vintage comedy in partnership with The Theatre Guild in New York City, scheduled for 2013.

Theatre companies in Arizona
Defunct companies of the United States